Ettekaal Second is a 2014 Indian Malayalam-language romantic drama film directed by Kanakaraghavan starring Govind Padmasoorya and Miya .

Cast

Production 
The film is titled Ettekaal Second because according to scientists if a man eyes a woman for eight-and-a-quarter-second, then that man is in love with the woman.

Soundtrack 
The songs are composed by K Santhosh. The song "Katharamam" was shot underwater. The film had the longest pictured song underwater for an Indian film at the time of its release. The entire song was filmed underwater. The underwater sequence was directed by Vinod Vijayan.

"Katharamam" - K. S. Chitra, Karthik (written by Rafeeq Ahamed)
"Vida Parayumen" - Vijay Yesudas

Release 
The Times of India gave the film two out of five stars and wrote that "However none of the scenes stand out simply because they appear squeezed in solely for the purpose of creating tenderness in a film built with clichés".

References

External links 

Indian romantic drama films
2014 romantic drama films
2010s Malayalam-language films